The state of Kentucky elected a Treasurer November 8, 2011.  Primaries for this election were held on Tuesday May 17, 2011.  The Kentucky Treasurer is elected every 4 years. The treasurer, who can serve two terms, acts as the state's chief elected fiscal officer.  Incumbent Todd Hollenbach defeated his two challengers.

The treasurers duties include:
 Act as head of the treasury KRS 041.020
 Create and manage the state's depository KRS 041-070
 Make record of all monies due and payable to the state KRS 041-100
 Process warrants from the Finance and Administration Cabinet KRS 041-150
 Make payments on behalf of the state KRS 041-160
 Make an annual report KRS 041-340

Background
Current Treasurer Todd Hollenbach is eligible to run for a second term and has announced he will do so.

Candidates

Democratic primary

Nominated 
 Todd Hollenbach, incumbent State Treasurer

Eliminated in primary 

 Steve Hamrick

Republicans
 K.C. Crosbie, Lexington-Fayette Urban County Council Member

Libertarians
 Ken Moellman

General election

Polling

Results

See also
 Kentucky Elections, 2011

References

External links
 K.C. Crosbie for State Treasurer
 Todd Hollenbach for State Treasurer
 Ken Moellman for State Treasurer

treasurer
Kentucky
Kentucky State Treasurer elections